Calisto debarriera is a butterfly of the family Nymphalidae. It is endemic to Hispaniola.

The larvae feed on various grasses.

Taxonomy
Calisto debarriera was originally treated as subspecies of Calisto confusa, and later regarded as color variant of C. confusa.

Gallery

References

Butterflies described in 1943
Calisto (butterfly)